Shelby Cullom Davis (April 1, 1909 – May 26, 1994) was an American businessman, investor, and philanthropist from the state of New York. In 1947 he created Shelby Cullom Davis & Company, which became a leading investment firm. He later served as the American Ambassador to Switzerland under Presidents Richard Nixon and Gerald Ford. Originally from Peoria, Illinois, Davis' uncle was Shelby Moore Cullom, who served in the U.S Senate for 30 years and introduced the legislation to create the Interstate Commerce Commission.

Education
After graduating from The Lawrenceville School in 1926, he matriculated to Princeton University, graduating in 1930 and earned a master's degree at Columbia University in 1931. He earned a doctorate in political science at the Graduate Institute of International Studies, Geneva, in 1934. His dissertation was about military personnel in Africa (Reservoirs of men, a history of the black troops of French West Africa).

Thomas E. Dewey
Shelby joined the staff of District Attorney Thomas E. Dewey as an economist and research assistant. He advised Dewey during his presidential runs in 1940 and 1944 and was later appointed by then-New York Governor Dewey as First Deputy Superintendent of Insurance from 1944 to 1947.

Business career
Prior to his government service, Shelby had worked as a European correspondent for CBS Radio in Geneva. In 1941 he became a member of the New York Stock Exchange. 6 years later, with an investment of $100,000 he founded and headed Shelby Cullom Davis & Company, an investment firm, specializing in insurance securities.  At the time of his death Shelby served as chairman. His son, Shelby Davis, formed Davis Selected Advisers in 1969 and by the 1980s had made the cut for Forbes Magazine's richest 400 Americans.

Death
Davis died at his home in Hobe Sound, Florida, aged 85, following a brief illness. He was survived by his wife of 44 years, Kathryn Wasserman Davis; two children Shelby M. C., of Manhattan; a daughter, Diana D. Spencer and eight grandchildren.

Philanthropy
He provided significant financial support to Princeton University, funded chairs and professorships at Wellesley College, and endowed the Cullom - Davis Library at Bradley University. A Professorship of International Security Studies at Fletcher School of Law and Diplomacy was also instituted in his name. He also provided support to the Library and Museum of the Performing Arts at Lincoln Center in NYC.  His generous support of the Society of Colonial Wars is recognized in part through the Shelby Cullom Davis Lecture. In December 2013 it was announced that through his charitable fund a $10 million donation was made to Colby College, Waterville, Maine.

The Shelby Cullom Davis Center for Historical Studies in the Department of History at Princeton University is named after Davis.

The use of funds meant to endow the Shelby Cullom professorship at Trinity College in Hartford, Connecticut led in part to the resignation of that college's president James Jones, as well as media attention to the donor intent issue.

Affiliations
Davis was chairman and treasurer of an eponymous, conservative think tank, the Shelby Cullom Davis Foundation, at the time of his death. He was also affiliated with the Heritage Foundation, The Mayflower Society, Sons of the Revolution, The Society of the Cincinnati and was an officer of The Huguenot Society of America.

References

External links
New York Times obituary for Shelby Cullom Davis
Victims of Communism Memorial: A Progress Report
The Kathryn and Shelby Cullom Davis Institute for International Studies
The Davis Funds
Princeton University's Davis Center

1909 births
1994 deaths
20th-century American businesspeople
20th-century American philanthropists
Ambassadors of the United States to Switzerland
American expatriates in Switzerland
American investment bankers
Businesspeople from Illinois
Businesspeople from New York (state)
Columbia University alumni
Graduate Institute of International and Development Studies alumni
New York (state) Republicans
People from Hobe Sound, Florida
People from Peoria, Illinois
People from Tarrytown, New York
Philanthropists from Illinois
Philanthropists from New York (state)
Princeton University alumni
The Heritage Foundation